Imeretis Papai is a newspaper published in the city of Kutaisi, located in Georgia.

Mass media in Kutaisi
Georgian-language newspapers
Newspapers published in Georgia (country)
Publications with year of establishment missing